Mufasir-ul-Haq (16 August 1944, Karnal, India – 27 July 1983) was a Pakistani cricketer who played in one Test in 1965.

A left-arm opening bowler, Mufasir played first-class cricket in Pakistan from 1960–61 to 1975–76. He toured Australia and New Zealand in 1964–65, playing his only Test at Lancaster Park, Christchurch, where he took the wickets of Ross Morgan (twice) and Bevan Congdon. His best first-class bowling figures, 4 for 16, came in his second match, for Karachi Whites against Karachi Greens in 1961–62.

He umpired one first-class match in Pakistan in 1975–76, just a few weeks after playing his last match.

He was only the second Pakistani Test cricketer to die, after Amir Elahi three years earlier.

References

External links
 Mufassir-ul-Haq at Cricket Archive
 Mufasir-ul-Haq at Cricinfo

1944 births
1983 deaths
Pakistan Test cricketers
People from Karnal
Pakistani cricketers
Karachi cricketers
Karachi Whites cricketers
Karachi B cricketers
Karachi Blues cricketers
Cricketers from Dhaka
Public Works Department cricketers
East Pakistan cricketers
National Bank of Pakistan cricketers
National Bank of Pakistan B cricketers